Marvel Animation, Inc. is an American animation production company. The Marvel Studios subsidiary was incorporated on January 25, 2008 to direct Marvel's efforts in animation and home entertainment markets. The incorporated Marvel Animation included then ongoing animation efforts by Marvel Studios with Lionsgate and Nickelodeon. Marvel Animation operates under Marvel Studios, a subsidiary of Disney Entertainment, a division of The Walt Disney Company.

Background 
Marvel Comics Group first entered the animated field through licensing to Grantray-Lawrence Animation for The Marvel Super Heroes anthology series in 1966. Marvel worked with Grantray-Lawrence, Hanna-Barbera, and DePatie–Freleng Enterprises on other animated series until 1980.

In 1980, Cadence Industries would purchase the remainder of DePatie–Freleng Enterprises to form Marvel Productions. Marvel Productions was merged into New World Entertainment's operations with the Marvel Entertainment Group's sale to Andrews Group, a Perlman corporation, in 1989. Marvel Productions became New World Animation by 1993.

Marvel Entertainment Group then set up a division, Marvel Films, to work with New World Entertainment's New World Family Filmworks, Inc., both under Avi Arad as president. Marvel Films Animation was set up and produced only a single show, Spider-Man in 1994. During this time, New World Animation and Saban Entertainment produced additional shows, with Saban eventually taking over production.

In August 1996, Marvel Entertainment Group decided to incorporate Marvel Films as Marvel Studios with the sale of New World Communications Group, Inc., Marvel's fellow Andrews Group subsidiary in film and television stations, funded with a sale of Toy Biz stock. In July 1996, Fox Children's Network secured rights from Marvel Entertainment Group for Captain America, Daredevil, Silver Surfer, and additional characters to be developed into four series and 52 episodes over seven years.

History

Animated features 
In 2004, Marvel Entertainment, Marvel Comics' new parent corporation, struck a deal with Lions Gate Entertainment to produce a series of eight direct-to-video animated movies under the name of Marvel Animated Features in conjunction with Marvel Studios, Marvel's direct film subsidiary. Eric Rollman was hired by Marvel as Executive Vice President, Home Entertainment & TV Production for Marvel Studios to oversee the deal with Lionsgate.

Incorporation 
Marvel Animation was incorporated in January 2008 to direct Marvel's efforts in animation and home entertainment markets including then animation efforts with Lionsgate and Nickelodeon. Marvel Entertainment named Eric Rollman as president of the company in April 2008, and reporting to Simon Philips, president of Marvel Entertainment International.

In early 2009, a home distribution deal for The Super Hero Squad Show was inked with Shout! Factory. In April 2009, the Marvel Knights Animation series was announced to be under development with Shout! Factory developing hybrid comic animation DVD series by converting existing material. On December 31, 2009, The Walt Disney Company purchased Marvel Animation with parent company Marvel Studios as part of the Marvel Entertainment group for $4 billion. Both Marvel and Disney have stated that the merger will not affect any preexisting deals with Lionsgate or other production companies for the time being, although Disney said they will consider distributing future Marvel Animation projects with their own studios once the current deals expire.

With the creation of the Marvel Television division in June 2010 within Marvel Studios, Marvel Animation will operate under Marvel TV's direction. In July 2010, Marvel entered into Superhero Anime Partners with Madhouse and Sony Pictures Entertainment Japan to develop and produce the Marvel Anime project that took famous Marvel characters and reintroduced them for a Japanese audience in four 12-part television series which aired on Animax in Japan and G4 in the United States.

In 2012, Marvel established its Marvel Animation Studios based in Glendale, California under Senior Vice President Eric Radomski. On April 1, Disney XD launched a block called Marvel Universe, with the premiere of Ultimate Spider-Man, followed by the returning The Avengers: Earth's Mightiest Heroes. The block is a result of Disney's 2009 Marvel acquisition. In June, Walt Disney Animation Studios announced they were in development with Marvel to make a film of Big Hero 6.

At San Diego Comic-Con in July, Marvel Television announced a second "season" of Marvel Knights Animation with Shout Factory and the involved titles. Following up on early anime productions in the Superhero Anime Partners, Marvel has re-partnered with Madhouse and Sony Pictures Entertainment Japan as SH DTV Partners for a direct to video anime feature film, Iron Man: Rise of Technovore.  Also in October, Marvel Animation Studios announced its first DTV production, a direct to video film, Iron Man & Hulk: Heroes United, to be released in 2013.

Marvel announced in May 2013, that the new shows, Avengers Assemble and Hulk and the Agents of S.M.A.S.H., would be shown on Disney XD as part of the Marvel Universe block and would be a part of the same fictional universe.  In October, Marvel announced that Disney Japan was producing a new anime television show with Toei Animation called Marvel Disk Wars: The Avengers to be aired on April 2, 2014 on TV Tokyo and other TXN stations.

A Guardians of the Galaxy animated series was officially announced in October 2014, with production set to begin for a 2015 release on Disney XD. In August 2015, Marvel Studios was integrated into the Walt Disney Studios, while Marvel Television and Animation were left under Marvel Entertainment and Perlmutter's control. Marvel announced a new anime television series titled, Marvel Future Avengers, that is set to be broadcast in mid-2017 on the Disney satellite channel, Dlife.

Marvel Entertainment announced a new pre-school franchise, Marvel Super Hero Adventures, in September 2017 consisting of a 10 short-form episodes animated series along with publishing and merchandise during "Marvel Mania" October. In the publishing field, Marvel Press issuing early reader chapter books in September, and of course, from Marvel Comics, a five-issue miniseries in April 2018. Super Hero Adventures has Spider-Man teaming with another Marvel hero. The animated episodes lasting 3-and-a-half minutes aired on Disney Channel's Disney Junior block followed by Disney Junior channel then Marvel HQ YouTube channel and DisneyNOW app.

On December 7, 2017, Marvel announced its Marvel Rising franchise focusing on new characters as youngsters starting with animation in 2018 with Ghost-Spider, a renamed Spider-Gwen, shorts and an animated film, Marvel Rising: Secret Warriors.

Marvel Animation's first full-length series for Disney Junior, Marvel's Spidey and His Amazing Friends was announced at D23 Expo. This series primary stars Spider-Man, Ghost-Spider and Miles Morales, another Spider-Man and is scheduled to premiere in summer 2021.

Under Marvel Studios 
In October 2019, Marvel Studios President Kevin Feige was given the title of Chief Creative Officer, Marvel, and will oversee the creative direction of Marvel Television and Marvel Family Entertainment (animation), with both moving back under the Marvel Studios banner. With the December 2019 announcement of the closure of its parent unit, Marvel Television, also came news that TV and animation executives at vice president level and above would be let go. This announcement included Cort Lane, senior vice president of Marvel Animation & Family Entertainment. He would leave in January 2020, and be replaced.

In 2023, Marvel Animation released Moon Girl and Devil Dinosaur, its first collaboration with Disney Television Animation. The studio is also expected to work with Disney TVA on future Marvel adaptations.

Units 
 Marvel Animation Studios (2012–)

Former units
Note: All Marvel Animated Features films that have been released or announced have been produced by MLG Productions, Marvel & Lionsgate's subsidiary group, and have been released direct-to-video by Lionsgate. The contract Marvel had with Lionsgate was for eight films, all of which have been released as of 2011.
 MLG Productions 1, Inc. -  MLG Productions 8, Inc. (2006–2011) Marvel Animated Features joint venture with Lionsgate
 SH Anime/DTV partnerships with Sony Pictures Entertainment Japan and Madhouse:
 Superhero Anime Partners (2010–2011): the Marvel Anime series
 SH DTV Partners (2012–2013): Iron Man: Rise of Technovore
 SH DTV AC BW&P Partners (2013–2014): Avengers Confidential: Black Widow & Punisher

Production library

Animated series

TV films

Direct-to-video films

Marvel Knights Animation 
Marvel Knights Animation is a hybrid comic-animation series. Episodes have been released on iTunes digitally and physically through Shout! Factory on DVD.

 Slate

See also 
 List of animated series based on Marvel Comics
 List of animated films based on Marvel Comics

References 

Film studios
 
2008 establishments in California
American companies established in 2008
Mass media companies established in 2008
American animation studios
Companies based in Glendale, California
Disney production studios
Disney acquisitions
Film production companies of the United States
Marvel Comics animation
Marvel Entertainment
Mass media companies disestablished in 2020
American companies disestablished in 2020